The Voice TV is a network of music television channels owned by ProSiebenSat.1 Media (formally SBS Broadcasting Group). Previously broadcast in Finland (2004-2012), Denmark (2004-2012), Norway (2004-2012) and Sweden (2004-2008). In October 2006 the channel began broadcasting in Bulgaria.

See also

 The Voice TV Bulgaria
 The Voice TV Danmark
 The Voice TV Finland
 The Voice TV Norway
 The Voice TV Sweden

References

External links
 Corporate Website 
 The Voice TV Bulgaria 
 The Voice TV Denmark 
 The Voice TV Norway 
 The Voice TV Finland 

 

Television channels in Finland